Mediterranea inopinata is a species of small land snail, a terrestrial pulmonate gastropod mollusc in the family Oxychilidae, the glass snails.

Distribution and conservation status
This species is not listed in IUCN red list - not evaluated (NE).

It occurs in:
 Czech Republic - near threatened (NT) in Bohemia, least concern (LC) in Moravia 
 Bulgaria
 Poland - endangered (EN) 
 Slovakia
 Ukraine
 and others

References

 Bank, R. A.; Neubert, E. (2017). Checklist of the land and freshwater Gastropoda of Europe. Last update: July 16th, 2017
 Sysoev, A. V. & Schileyko, A. A. (2009). Land snails and slugs of Russia and adjacent countries. Sofia/Moskva (Pensoft). 312 pp., 142 plates

External links
  Clessin, S. (1887-1890). Die Mollusken-Fauna Mitteleuropa's. II. Teil. Die Molluskenfauna Oesterreich-Ungarns und der Schweiz, 858 pp.

inopinata
Gastropods described in 1887